Otto Stoll (29 December 1849 in Frauenfeld – 18 August 1922 in Zürich) was a Swiss linguist and ethnologist.

Otto Stoll was a professor of ethnology and geography at the University of Zurich who specialized in research of Mayan languages. From 1878 to 1883 he conducted scientific studies in Guatemala. He was the author of several treatises on Guatemala, including important works in the fields on ethnography and ethno-linguistics.

Publications 
 Zur Ethnographie der Republik Guatemala (Ethnography of the Republic of Guatemala), 1884. 
 Guatemala: Reisen und Schilderungen aus den Jahren 1878–1883 (Guatemala: travel and descriptions from the years 1878–1883), 1886. 
 Biologia Centrali-Americana/ Arachnida – Acaridea, (Central American biology, Arachnida - Acaridae), 1886–1893. 
 Die Sprache der Ixil-Indianer: ein Beitrag zur Ethnologie und Linguistik der Maya-Völker (The language of the Ixil people: a contribution to anthropology and linguistics of the Mayan peoples), 1887. 
 Die Sprache der Ixil-Indianer/ Nebst einem Anhang/ Wortverzeichnisse aus dem nordwestlichen Guatemala (The language of the Ixil people; including an addendum and directory of northwestern Guatemala), 1887. 
 Suggestion und Hypnotismus in der Völkerpsychologie (Suggestion and hypnotism in ethnic psychology), 1894.
 Zur Zoogeographie der landbewohnenden Wirbellosen (Zoogeography of terrestrial invertebrates), 1897. 
 Das Geschlechtsleben in der Völkerpsychologie, (Sex life in ethnic psychology), 1908 
 Zur Kenntnis des Zauberglaubens der Volksmagie und Volksmedizin in der Schweiz (Information involving the fascination with folk magic and medicine in Switzerland), 1909.

References 
 This article is based on a translation of an equivalent article at the German Wikipedia.

External links
 

Ethnographers
Swiss ethnologists
Ethnolinguists
Academic staff of the University of Zurich
Academic staff of ETH Zurich
Swiss anthropologists
Swiss Mesoamericanists
19th-century Mesoamericanists
Linguists of Mesoamerican languages
Mesoamerican anthropologists
People from Frauenfeld
1849 births
1922 deaths